Aisha Sekindi (born 4 December 1970) is a Ugandan educator and legislator. As of February 2022, she serves as Uganda's Minister of State for Water and the woman representative for Kalungu district in Uganda's eleventh parliament. She held the same position in Uganda's tenth parliament. Politically, she is affiliated to the National Resistance Movement under whose ticket she contested in the 2016 general election, achieving victory over Aisha Naluyati Waligo.

Background and education 

Aisha Sekindi attended Kyato Muslim Primary School which she left in 1984 to join Kadugala Secondary School for her O Levels (Uganda Certificate of Education), which she obtained in 1988. Later on in 1995, she obtained a Teachers Certificate from Kibuli Teacher Training College.

Career 
Though Aisha Sekindi started out as a deputy headteacher at Saint Kizito Primary School, Lwengo (1997 to 2001), she moved on to becoming the Local Council V Councillor for Lwabenge and Secretary for Gender with Masaka District Local Government between 2001 and 2007.

Prior to becoming a legislator, Aisha Sekindi served as deputy Resident District Commissioner for Lira district between 2013 and 2014. Before that, she had served in the same position in Tororo District (2011 to 2013) and Kamuli District (2007 to 2011). Between 2010 and 2011, she was the Acting Resident District Commissioner for Buyende district.

As a female legislator in the tenth parliament of Uganda, she belonged to the Uganda Women Parliamentary Association (UWOPA) and is listed as a member of the committee for agriculture.

See also 
 Parliament of Uganda
 List of members of the tenth Parliament of Uganda
Lira District
 Tororo District
 Kamuli District
 Kalungu District

References

External links 
 Website of the Parliament of Uganda
 Website of the Ministry of Water and Environment

1970 births
Living people
Ugandan Muslims
Members of the Parliament of Uganda
Women members of the Parliament of Uganda
National Resistance Movement politicians
People from Kalungu District
21st-century Ugandan women politicians
21st-century Ugandan politicians